Wackersberg is a municipality  in the district of Bad Tölz-Wolfratshausen in Bavaria in Germany.

References

Bad Tölz-Wolfratshausen